USS Kenneth M. Willett (DE-354) was a  acquired by the U.S. Navy during World War II. The primary purpose of the destroyer escort was to escort and protect ships in convoy, in addition to other tasks as assigned, such as patrol or radar picket.

Namesake
Kenneth Martin Willett was born on 9 April 1919 in Overland, Missouri. He enlisted in the Naval Reserve as an apprentice seaman on 9 July 1940. He then reported to the 12th Naval District for duty at the Armed Guard Center, San Francisco, California, in January 1942. While serving as commanding officer of the Naval Armed Guard on board the freighter SS Stephen Hopkins, he was promoted to Lieutenant (j.g.) on 15 June.

While en route from Cape Town, South Africa to Paramaribo, Dutch Guiana, his freighter was attacked on 27 September 1942 by two Kriegsmarine surface raiders. Though seriously wounded by one of the first enemy shells, he manned the 4-inch gun and fired shell after shell into the nearer, more heavily armed raider. Inflicting heavy damage on both enemy ships, his accurate fire eventually sank the Stier. Even after an exploding magazine silenced his gun, he refused to give up his struggle for both ship and crew. When last seen, although weakened and suffering, he was helping to launch life rafts from the flaming freighter in an effort to save lives. He was posthumously awarded the Navy Cross.

Construction and commissioning
The ship was launched on 7 March 1944 by Consolidated Steel Corp. at their yard in Orange, Texas, sponsored by Mrs. D. C. Willett, mother of Lt. (j.g.) Willett. The destroyer escort was commissioned on 19 July 1944 at Orange.

History

World War II 
After shakedown and training off Bermuda, Kenneth M. Willett served as a training ship in the Chesapeake Bay from 1 to 20 October. Joining CortDiv 82, she departed Norfolk, Virginia, 21 October for duty in the Pacific with the U.S. 7th Fleet. Steaming via the Panama Canal, the Galápagos Islands, and the New Hebrides, she reached Hollandia, New Guinea, 28 November.

Assigned to convoy escort duty between Humboldt Bay, New Guinea, and Leyte Gulf, Philippines, Kenneth M. Willett made seven trips from 13 December 1944 to 25 February 1945. On 1 January 1945, while she screened a convoy to Hollandia, Kenneth H. Willett'''s guns brought down an attacking enemy torpedo plane close aboard one of the merchant ships.

Upon arriving Leyte Gulf 25 February, the destroyer escort was assigned to patrol and ASW duty. Steaming to Mangarin Bay, Mindoro, 6 March, she made hunter-killer patrols off Mindoro and Luzon, then returned to Leyte Gulf 4 June for escort duty between Leyte and Ulithi, Western Carolines. After two runs to Ulithi, she resumed patrol duty off Mindoro 2 July; and on the 10th she returned to Leyte for a convoy escort run to Okinawa.

Departing 17 July with a convoy of LCIs and LSTs, Kenneth M. Willett steamed via Casiguran Bay, Luzon, for the Ryūkyūs. After safely passing through a typhoon 30 to 31 July, the convoy reached Okinawa 7 August. Kenneth M. Willett departed the next day for Leyte. During the next 16 weeks she made convoy runs out of Leyte and Manila to Ulithi, Tokyo, and Shanghai. And from 29 December to 29 January 1946 she operated out of Guiuan Roadstead, Samar, on intermittent weather patrols east of Leyte Gulf.

Steaming to Manila 10 February, Kenneth M. Willett cleared the bay 15 February for patrol duty along the Chinese coast. She arrived Tsingtao 20 February with five other destroyer escorts and commenced operations from the Yellow Sea to Shanghai in support of Chinese Nationalists' efforts to wrest control of the northern Chinese Mainland from the Communists. Following ASW operations in the North Yellow Sea 1 to 5 April, she departed Tsingtao 15 April en route to the United States. Steaming via Guam, Eniwetok, and Pearl Harbor, she arrived San Pedro, Los Angeles, 11 May. She decommissioned 24 October and entered the Pacific Reserve Fleet at San Diego, California, 10 November.

 Korean War operations 

During the Korean War Kenneth M. Willett recommissioned 25 May 1951 at San Diego. After shakedown along the California coast, she departed San Diego 4 September and steamed via the Panama Canal en route to New Orleans, Louisiana, where she arrived 18 September for duty as a Naval Reserve training ship. Assigned to the 8th Naval District, she departed 5 November on a Naval Reserve cruise to San Juan, Puerto Rico. From then until 16 October 1958 she made 63 training cruises that carried her from New Orleans to South America, Canada, the eastern seaboard of the United States, and throughout the Caribbean. During this time she rendered vitally important service, making certain that men of the Naval Reserve remained qualified to serve on a moment's notice to guard the nation's security on the high seas.

 Final decommissioning 

Upon her arrival from Havana, Cuba, 16 October 1958 Kenneth M. Willett'' completed her final training cruise. She departed New Orleans 30 November, arriving Orange, Texas, the following day. She then was painted, all equipment was made operational and closed up and sealed and was decommissioned 26 February 1959. Assigned to the Atlantic Reserve Fleet, she was berthed at Philadelphia, Pennsylvania. On 1 July 1972 she was struck from the Navy List, and, on 6 March 1974, she was sunk as a target off the coast of Puerto Rico.

References

External links 

 NavSource Online: Destroyer Escort Photo Archive – USS Kenneth M. Willett (DE-354)

John C. Butler-class destroyer escorts
Ships built in Orange, Texas
1944 ships
World War II frigates and destroyer escorts of the United States
Ships sunk as targets
Maritime incidents in 1974